Sean O'Flynn  is a Gaelic footballer from Ballybrittas in County Laois.

He usually plays in defence for the Laois county football team and in 2018 and again in 2019 was part of the Laois team that reached the final of the Leinster Under 20 Football Championship.

Honours
Club
 Laois Intermediate Football Championship (1):2018
 Laois Under 20 Football Championship (1):2019
 Laois Minor Football Championship (1):2016
 Laois All-County Football League Division Two (1): 2018

County

References

2000 births
Living people
Laois inter-county Gaelic footballers
Courtwood Gaelic footballers